William Joseph Chamberlain (died 1945) was an English journalist and pacifist.  He was a member of the No-Conscription Fellowship during the First World War and edited its newspaper, The Tribunal.  After the war, he managed the Labour Party's press office and edited the party's Birmingham weekly The Town Crier.  In 1921, he presided over the meeting in London which established the No More War Movement.

References

Year of birth missing
1945 deaths
English pacifists